DokuFest is an international documentary and short film festival held in the Kosovo city of Prizren, held annually during August. It was founded in 2002 by a group of friends. It has since grown into a cultural event that attracts international and regional artists and audiences. Films are screened throughout the eight-day festival and accompanied by programs, activities, and workshops.

In 2022 Dokufest became a nominating film festival for the European Film Awards in two categories, short film and documentary film.

"Kosovo is known more for conflict than culture, but at a film festival in the country's prettiest town, partying and arts mix to great effect." The Guardian

Background

DokuFest was established as a volunteer-based organization with almost no funding at the beginning and continues to draw support from the community and agencies within Kosovo. However, its path has often been associated with major difficulties due to the unique context that organization operated in (such as the post-war situation, lack of similar referent events, lack of trust from institutions and potential donors etc.)

It was run by volunteers until the introduction of full-time and part-time contracts came into place in 2008 and led to the employment of a small number of staff. The need for an organizational structure arose when the organization became involved in implementation of yearly-based projects, in addition to organizing the festival. This led to the establishment of a core team that took over the design, planning and implementation of many initiatives resulting in successful implementation of several projects.

As well as organizing large-scale cultural events, DokuFest also concerns culture, education and activism for sound cultural policies and alternative education system in Kosovo.

As of 2014 more than 18,000 visitors from across the world went to Prizren during DokuFest.

The overall program

Various events happen within the scope of the festival: workshops, DokuPhoto exhibitions, festival camping and concerts.

The festival that includes screening of films in seven improvised cinemas in the city of Prizren, photographic exhibition "DokuPhoto", Workshops, Master Classes and debates, amongst others.

The festival's creative director is one of its founding members, Veton Nurkollari.

Film training initiative called "Human Rights Film Factory - Stories from Kosovo’s Margins" that includes series of workshops for filmmakers, production of six documentaries on Human Rights coupled with series of human rights debates throughout Kosovo.
Promotion of Human Rights and Democratic Values through Film that includes usage of human rights documentary films as educational tools and establishment of Kino Clubs in Highs Schools as well as Documentary film school guiding high school students from Kosovo throughout the process of transforming their film ideas into a finished documentary.
Travelling Cinema “Cinema at Your Door” aiming at documentary film screenings in rural areas of Prizren region coupled with discussions focusing on the difficulties that rural communities experience in their everyday life and the lack of the cultural activities in their surroundings.
Part of larger NGO network working actively on environmental related issues and promotion of renewables in Kosovo.
Active participation and contribution on national and regional networks, aimed at development of sound cultural policies and organization of debates with relevant stakeholders, both in Kosovo and the region.

Cinema experience
The festival's roots lie at Prizren's oldest cinema Lumbardhi Cinema, where its first edition was held. DokuFest continues to hold a strong relationship with the cinema's parent NGO Lumbardhi Foundation as the host of its two primary venues, Lumbardhi Indoor (used during the day) and Lumbardhi Outdoor (used during the night, aka "Lumbardhi Bahçe"). DokuFest also uses its native cinema DokuKino (placed at the Europa Complex, next to the festival headquarters) with an indoor and outdoor silver screen (aka DokuKino Plato/Plateau).

Multiple spots of cultural and historical significance across Prizren are used as makeshift venues. These include:
 River Cinema (Kino Lum) is built on a platform directly over the Lumbardhi river.
 Sonar Cinema is built on a platform just outside the Prizren Fortress.
 Lunar Cinema is built inside the Fortress, often also the venue for musical acts.
 Kino Klubi, a film club/pub near the Remzi Ademaj High School, often the venue for talks.

DokuNights
DokuFest brings top international and local music acts to perform at DokuNights every year. DokuNights has become Kosovo's premiere music event featuring international and local singers, bands and DJs past performances have including acts such as PJ Harvey. It is regularly held at the Andrra Stage in the Marash Park.

DokuTech
Runs simultaneous to DokuFest and concentrates on technical innovation and creativity.

DokuFest Productions

DokuFest was awarded the British Academy Film Award for Home in 2017.

DokuKids
A program of films and workshops designed especially for young guests.

Theme and slogan

Every year the festival is programmed and created around a theme that forges a unique annual identity.

Awards 
 Best National Competition
 Best International Feature Documentary 
 Best International Short Documentary 
 Best International Shorts
 Best Balkan Dox
 Best Human Rights 
 Best Green 
 Audience Award
 Best Procredit EKO Video

In 2010 DokuFest was voted as one of the 25 best international documentary festivals.

Winner 

In 2014 DokuFest won Best Poster, and Best Festival Identity at the Jihlava International Documentary Film Festival for its poster and its immersive campaign, respectively, both designed by Daniel Mulloy.

References

External links

Official Website of the Festival
An article about DokuFest
Directory of International Film and Video Festivals on BritFilms.com

Documentary film festivals in Kosovo
Short film festivals
Film festivals in Kosovo
Summer events in Kosovo